Graderia subintegra is a species of plant in the family Orobanchaceae. It is found in grasslands and on rocky outcrops in southern Africa. It flowers from September to November.

Description
A perennial low shrub, growing from a somewhat woody rootstock. The trailing or ascending stems radiate from the crown of the root.

References

Orobanchaceae